Limatula maoria is a species of bivalve mollusc in the family Limidae.

References
 Powell A. W. B., New Zealand Mollusca, William Collins Publishers Ltd, Auckland, New Zealand 1979 

Limidae
Bivalves of New Zealand
Taxa named by Harold John Finlay
Bivalves described in 1927